Martin Stephani (2 November 1915 – 9 June 1983) was a German conductor and professor.

Stephani was born in Eisleben. After a position of music director of the city of Wuppertal, he was from 1957 to 1980 a professor of conducting at the Hochschule für Musik Detmold, serving as the institute's president from 1959 to 1982. He conducted the choir of Musikvereins der Stadt Bielefeld in Bielefeld. One of his students was the organist and professor Martin Lücker.

References

External links 

German male conductors (music)
German music theorists
People from Eisleben
1915 births
1983 deaths
20th-century German musicologists
20th-century German conductors (music)
20th-century German male musicians